Bent Hesselmann  (born February 20, 1939 in Copenhagen) is a Danish saxophonist, flautist and composer.

See also
List of Danish composers

References

Danish composers
Male composers
Danish saxophonists
Male saxophonists
Danish flautists
1939 births
Living people
21st-century saxophonists
21st-century male musicians
21st-century flautists